= Paule Lejeune =

French poet (1925–2014)

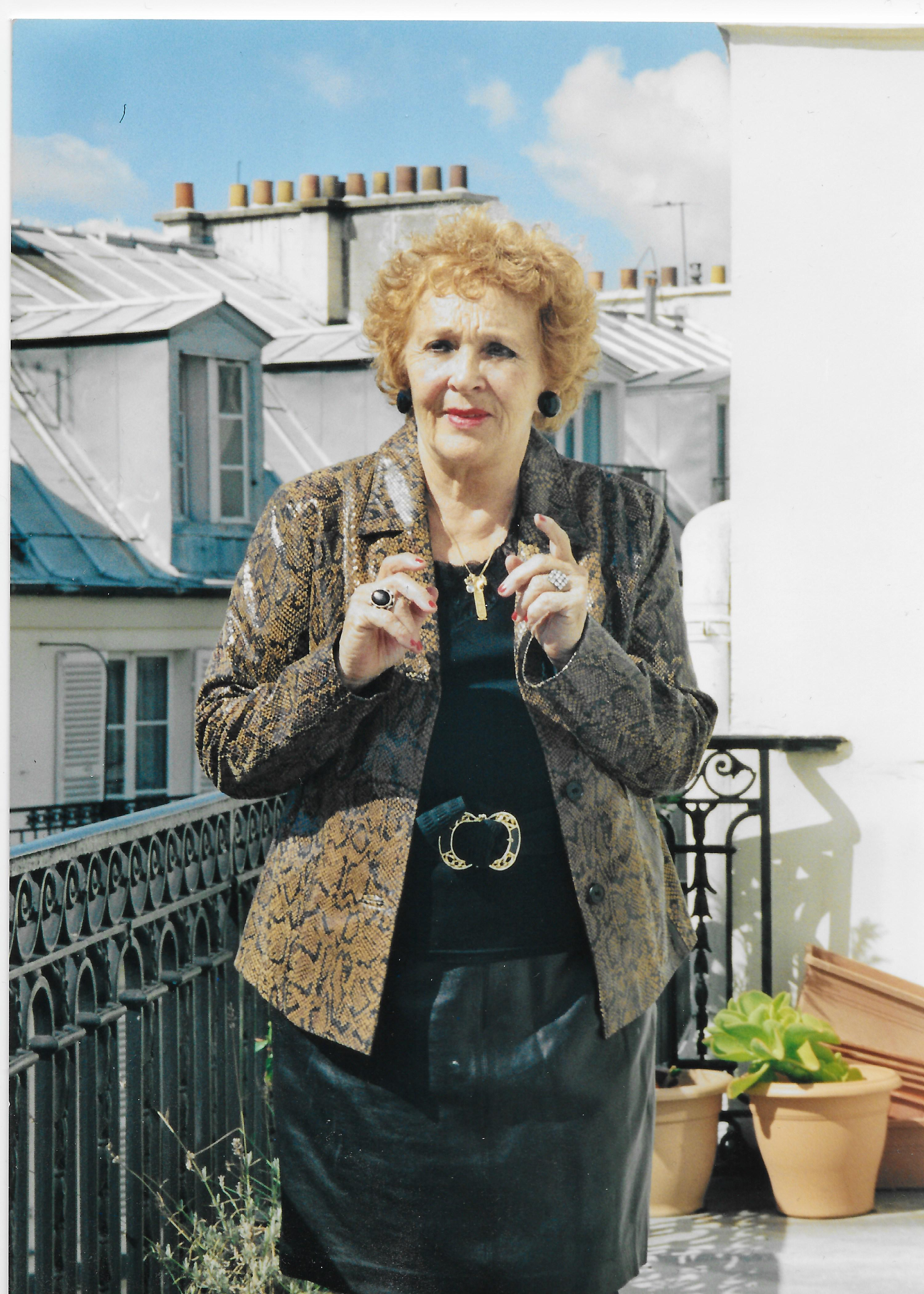
Paule Lejeune in Paris

Paule Lejeune (February, 22 1925 — April 2, 2014) was a French poet and author. Lejeune was born in Bonn, Germany on February, 22 1925. She died in Paris, France on April 2, 2014.

== Works ==
- Le Cinéma des femmes (1987)
- Les Reines de France (1990)
